An interlingual homograph is a word that occurs in more than one written language, but which has a different meaning or pronunciation in each language. For example word "done" (pronounced /dʌn/) is an adjective in English, a verb in Spanish (present subjunctive form of donar) and a noun in Czech (vocative singular form of don, pronounced /ˈdonɛ/).

A homograph is a word that is written the same as another word, but which (usually) has a different meaning. Interlingual means "spanning multiple languages". In some cases, the identical spelling of a word in two languages is coincidental; in other cases, it is because they descend from the same ancestor word. Words that come from the same ancestor are called cognates.

Another way of describing interlingual homographs is to say that they are orthographically identical, since a language's orthography describes the rules for writing the language: spelling, diacritics, capitalization, hyphenation, word dividers, etc.

See also

 List of English–Spanish interlingual homographs
 Heterography and homography
 Homograph
 Polysemy
 Translingualism

References

Multilingualism
Orthography
Translation
Word play